Pyrus oxyprion is a species of plant in the family Rosaceae. It is endemic to Turkey.

References

oxyprion
Endemic flora of Turkey
Trees of Turkey
Near threatened flora of Asia
Taxonomy articles created by Polbot